MTA may refer to:

Organizations

Transportation
 Metropolitan Transportation Authority, the public transport agency in the metropolitan area of New York City, United States
 Metropolitan Transit Authority (disambiguation), which may refer to several public transport agencies in other American cities
 Flint Mass Transportation Authority, Genesee County, Michigan
 Maine Turnpike Authority, Maine
 Manchester Transit Authority, New Hampshire
 Maryland Transit Administration
 Massachusetts Bay Transportation Authority, formerly Metropolitan Transit Authority
 Massachusetts Turnpike Authority
 Mendocino Transit Authority, California
 Mountain Ash railway station, Wales, National Rail station code
 Nashville Metropolitan Transit Authority, Tennessee
 San Francisco Municipal Transportation Agency, California
Los Angeles County Metropolitan Transportation Authority
 Mersin-Tarsus-Adana Railway, a defunct Ottoman railway company

Education
 Hungarian Academy of Sciences (Magyar Tudományos Akadémia), Budapest, Hungary
 Marsha Stern Talmudical Academy, an Orthodox Jewish private high school in New York, New York, US
 Mount Allison University, a university in Sackville, New Brunswick, Canada
 Musical Theatre Academy, a drama college based in London, UK

Other
 Metrolina Theatre Association, an organization which advocates performing arts in Charlotte, North Carolina, US
 MTA Records, More Than Alot Records, a record label
 Muslim Television Ahmadiyya International, a satellite television network
 Move to Amend, a U.S. political advocacy organization that seeks to amend the Constitution
 Manufacturing Technologies Association, a UK trade association
 Market Technicians Association, a non-profit organization of technical analysts
 General Directorate of Mineral Research and Exploration (Turkey), known as MTA
 Michigan Townships Association, an association of US township governments
 Mong Tai Army, an armed rebel group

Sports
 Maccabi Tel Aviv, a sports club in Israel
 Maccabi Tel Aviv B.C., basketball team
 Maccabi Tel Aviv F.C., football (soccer) team
 Maximum time aloft, a sporting event with a boomerang

Science and technology
 methylthioadenosine, a cofactor in biochemistry
 4-Methylthioamphetamine, a designer drug of the substituted amphetamine class developed in the 1990s
 Material transfer agreement, governing the transfer of research materials between two organizations
 Mineral trioxide aggregate, dental material, used in endodontics and vital pulp therapy
 MTA (Swedish: Mobiltelefonisystem A), a former manual mobile network in Sweden
 Medial temporal lobe type of brain atrophy.
 Mousterian of Acheulean tradition (fr), a cultural and technological facies of the Mousterian

Computing
 Cray MTA-2, a supercomputer based on the design of the never-built Tera MTA
 Message transfer agent or mail transfer agent, software that transfers e-mail between computers
 Multi-touch attribution is a form of attribution (marketing)
 Multimedia terminal adapter, a combination cable modem and telephone adapter
 Multi-Threaded Apartment, a concept used in Microsoft's Component Object Model programming architecture
 Microsoft Technology Associate, a certification scheme run by Microsoft

Gaming
 Multi Theft Auto, a mod for computer games in the PC game series Grand Theft Auto

Other uses
 UAC/HAL Il-214 Multirole Transport Aircraft, a planned medium-lift military transport
 "M.T.A." (song), or "Charlie on the M.T.A.", a 1959 hit song by The Kingston Trio
 Mid-term adjustment, a change in an insurance policy
 Military Technical Agreement, treaty ending the Kosovo War in June 1999
 Major trading area, a geographic region of the US surrounding a major city; See List of Basic Trading Areas
 Farmall M-TA, a widely-used model in the Farmall M tractor series
 Milk Tea Alliance, an online democracy and human rights movement

See also
 Metastasis-associated protein:
 MTA1
 MTA2
 MTA3